Nekouzsky District is an administrative and municipal district (raion), one of the seventeen in Yaroslavl Oblast, Russia. It is located in the west of the oblast. Its administrative center is the rural locality (a selo) of Novy Nekouz. Population: 15,688 (2010 Census);  The population of Novy Nekouz accounts for 22.1% of the district's total population.

References

Sources

Districts of Yaroslavl Oblast